Kalamkari is a type of hand-painted cotton textile produced in the Indian state of Andhra Pradesh. Only natural dyes are used in Kalamkari, which involves twenty-three steps.

There are two distinctive styles of Kalamkari art in India – Srikalahasti style and the Machilipatnam style. The Srikalahasti style of Kalamkari, where the "kalam" or pen is used for freehand drawing of the subject and filling in the colors, is entirely hand worked. This style flourished in temples centered on creating unique religious identities, appearing on scrolls, temple hangings, chariot banners as well as depictions of deities and scenes taken from the Hindu epics (e.g. Ramayana, Mahabharata and Purana). The style owes its present status to Kamaladevi Chattopadhyay who popularized the art as the first chairperson of the All India Handicrafts Board.

Etymology 
Historically, Kalamkari used to be termed as Pattachitra, an art form still found in neighboring Odisha and other parts of India and Nepal. The term "Pattachitra" (Sanskrit: पट्टचित्र) translates to "patta", meaning "cloth", with "chitra" meaning "picture". Paintings made on fabric and fabric scrolls are mentioned in ancient Hindu, Buddhist and Jain literature. 

Under medieval Islamic rule, the term Kalamkari was derived from the words "kalam", which means "pen" in Persian, and "kari", which means craftmanship in Persian. This term became popular under the patronage of the Golconda sultanate.

History 
Musicians and painters, known as chitrakars, moved from village to tell the village dwellers the stories of Hindu mythology. They illustrated their accounts using large bolts of canvas painted on the spot with simple means and dyes extracted from plants. Similarly, the ones found in Hindu temples are large panels of Kalamkari depicting the episodes of Hindu mythology and iconography, similar to Buddhist Thangka paintings.

As an art form, it was found in the wealthy peak of Golconda sultanate, Hyderabad, in the Middle Ages. The Mughals who patronized this craft in the Coromandel and Golconda province called the practitioners of this craft "Qualamkars", from which the term "Kalamkari" evolved. The Pedana Kalamkari craft made in Pedana nearby Machilipatnam in Krishna district, Andhra Pradesh, evolved under the patronage of the Mughals and the Golconda sultanate. Owing to the said patronage, this school was influenced by Persian art under Islamic rule. 

Kalamkari art has been practiced by many families in Andhra Pradesh, some villages in Tamil Nadu (Sikkalnayakanpettai) by migrants from Telugu speaking families over the generations have constituted their livelihood. Kalamkari had a period of decline, then was revived in India and abroad for its craftsmanship. Since the 18th century, the British have enjoyed the decorative element for clothing.

Middle forms 
In the Middle Ages, the term was also used to refer to the making of any cotton fabric patterned through the medium of vegetable dyes by free-hand and block-printing, produced in many regions of India. In places where the fabric is block printed, the kalam (pen) is used to draw finer details and for application of some colors.

Modern day  
In modern times, traditional techniques have been replaced by digital techniques. In this era, new techniques are introduced and the digital files of Kalamkari have been introduced widely over the regions of India.

Nowadays, in India, silk, mulmul, cotton, and synthetic sarees are also sold with Kalamkari print. Printing is a much easier task than traditional Kalamkari work. Kalamkari dupattas and blouse pieces are popular among Indian women.

Technique 
The first step in creating Kalamkari is steeping it in astringents and buffalo milk and then drying it under the sun. Afterwards, the red, black, brown, and violet portions of the designs are outlined with a mordant and cloth are then placed in a bath of alizarin. The next step is to cover the cloth, except for the parts to be dyed blue, in wax, and immerse the cloth in indigo dye. The wax is then scraped off and the remaining areas are painted by hand, similar to Indonesian batik.

To create design contours, artists use a bamboo or date palm stick pointed at one end with a bundle of fine hair attached to this pointed end to serve as the brush or pen. This pen is soaked in a mixture of jaggery and water; one by one these are applied, then the vegetable dyes are added.

In Iran, the fabric is printed using patterned wooden stamps.

Color fixing 
Dyes for the cloth are obtained by extracting colors from various roots, leaves, and mineral salts of iron, tin, copper, and alum. Various effects are obtained by using cow dung, seeds, plants and crushed flowers to obtain natural dye. Along with buffalo milk, myrobalan is used in kalamkari. Myrobalan is also used to remove the odd smell of buffalo milk. The fixing agents available in the myrobalan can easily fix the dye or color of the textile while treating the fabric. Alum is used in making natural dyes and also while treating the fabric. Alum ensures the stability of the color in Kalamkari fabric.

Themes
Kalamkari specifically depicts epics such as the Ramayana or Mahabharata. However, there are recent applications of the Kalamkari technique to depict Buddha and Buddhist art forms. In recent times, many aesthetically good figures such as musical instruments, small animals, flowers, Buddha and few Hindu symbols, like swastika are also introduced to Kalamkari.

References

Further reading
 (see index: p. 148–152)

Textile arts of India
Printed fabrics
Painted fabrics
Schools of Indian painting
Culture of Andhra Pradesh
Iranian art
Persian handicrafts
 Indian folk art
Textile arts of Persia
.